Little River is a  river in Trigg County, Kentucky, in the United States. It rises in Christian County southwest of Hopkinsville where the two branches: North Fork and South Fork merge. From the confluence, it meanders northwesterly past Cadiz before emptying into Lake Barkley. It is a tributary of the Cumberland River and therefore, via the Ohio River, part of the Mississippi River watershed.

The surrounding region is low rolling hills and farmland. Bedrock consists of limestone, and there are numerous springs, caves and bluffs along the river's edge. The stream bed is composed mostly of clay and mud with some bedrock, gravel and limestone boulders.

See also
List of rivers of Kentucky

References

USGS information

Rivers of Kentucky
Rivers of Trigg County, Kentucky
Rivers of Christian County, Kentucky
Tributaries of the Cumberland River